Bishop of Philadelphia can refer to the head of the following ecclesiastical dioceses:

 Metropolis of Philadelphia, one of the historical Seven Churches of Asia, in what is now Turkey
 Roman Catholic Archdiocese of Philadelphia, in the United States
 Ukrainian Catholic Archeparchy of Philadelphia, in the United States